Helicops carinicaudus is a species of snake in the family Colubridae. It is endemic to eastern Brazil. Specimens from Colombia are likely mislabeled, probably representing Helicops danieli.

There are two subspecies:

The former subspecies Helicops carinicaudus infrataeniatus is now considered a valid species, Helicops infrataeniatus.

References 

Helicops
Snakes of South America
Reptiles of Brazil
Endemic fauna of Brazil
Taxa named by Prince Maximilian of Wied-Neuwied
Reptiles described in 1825